Eva Gunilla Cederström (later Warchalowski, born 19 May 1944) is a retired Swedish track and field athlete who competed at the 1968 Summer Olympics in the long jump and pentathlon. She was the Swedish champion in the long jump (1961–64 and 1968), standing long jump (1959–62 and 1965), pentathlon (1961) and 4 × 100 m relay (1961, 1964–66 and 1968), and held national record in the long jump and pentathlon. She also competed in volleyball.

References

1943 births
Living people
Swedish pentathletes
Swedish female long jumpers
Olympic athletes of Sweden
Athletes (track and field) at the 1968 Summer Olympics
Sportspeople from Jönköping